Cooper Enterprises Inc. (sometimes referred to as Cooper Yachts Limited) was a Canadian boat builder based in Port Coquitlam, British Columbia. The company specialized in the design and manufacture of fibreglass sailboats and powerboats.

The company was founded by Forbes Cooper in 1970 and closed in 1990.

History

The company was formed to produce the designs of American sailboat builder Catalina Yachts under licence and actually built the Catalina 22 and Catalina 27 at its Port Coquitlam facility.

The company went on to produce sailboats under its own name, including the Cooper 416 in 1978 and the Cooper 353 in the following year, plus the Prowler line of motorboats. Under the name Cooper Yachts the company had sales subsidiaries in Seattle, Washington and Newport Beach, California in 1985. At least 17 sailboat designs were produced before the company ceased operations after 20 years in business, in 1990.

In a 1983 review of the company's products in Cruising World, Dan Spurr wrote, "all the Cooper yachts have a bit of a different look to them, tailored as they are to the climatic conditions in which they are built. Each seems to be a pleasant combination of form and function."

A Chris Caswell review in Yachting magazine in 1984 noted the long motoring range of the company's motorsailers. Caswell also singled out the Sea Bird 37 MS as "the purest motorsailer from this company".

Boats 

Summary of boats built by Cooper Enterprises:

Catalina 22 - 1970
Catalina 27 - 1971
Maple Leaf 48 - 1972
Maple Leaf 54 - 1972
Martin 29 - 1972
Ganbare 35 - 1973
Sea Bird 37 - 1973
Sea Bird 37 MS - 1973
Fortune 30 - 1974
Maple Leaf 42 - 1976
Cooper 416 - 1978
Cooper 353 - 1979
Cooper 508 - 1981
Banner 32 - 1982
Banner 37 - 1982
Cooper 367 - 1984
Maple Leaf 45 - 1985

See also
List of sailboat designers and manufacturers

References

Cooper Enterprises